Wishfire is a full length album by The Crüxshadows released in 2002.

Track listing
"Before the Fire"
"Return (Coming Home)"
"Binary"
"Seraphs"
"Spectators"
"Tears"
"Go Away"
"4th Phase"
"Earthfall"
"Orphean Wing"
"Carnival"
"Resist/R"
"Roman"
"Spiral (Don't Fall)"

References

External links
 Crüxshadows' official site

2002 albums
The Crüxshadows albums